Julius Lenhart (November 27, 1875 in Vienna – November 10, 1962 in Vienna) was an Austrian gymnast who competed in the 1904 Summer Olympics. He won two gold medals and one silver medal, making him the most successful Austrian competitor ever at the Summer Olympic Games.

He started his career in Vienna at a local gymnastics club. Due to his work as mechanical engineer he came to Germany and Switzerland, where he continued to compete in local clubs at the beginning of the 20th century.  In 1903 he travelled to the United States and found work and a new gymnastics club in Philadelphia.  As a member of Philadelphia Turngemeinde, Lenhart competed at the Olympic Games in St. Louis in 1904. Soon after the games he returned to Austria where he retired from gymnastics in 1908.

Because athletes did not compete for their nations at early Olympic Games as they do now, some references credit Lenharts medals to the United States instead of Austria, as he was representing his Philadelphia-based club, but some parts of the IOC database regard him as Austrian.

References

Sources

External links
Profile
Biography with pictures 
Biography 

1875 births
1962 deaths
Sportspeople from Vienna
Austrian male artistic gymnasts
Gymnasts at the 1904 Summer Olympics
Olympic gold medalists for Austria
Olympic silver medalists for Austria
Olympic medalists in gymnastics
Olympic gymnasts of Austria
Medalists at the 1904 Summer Olympics
20th-century Austrian people
Sportspeople from the Austro-Hungarian Empire